Essa Al Kuwari (born 11 November 1982) is a Qatari footballer who is a midfielder for Al Sadd. He was a member of the Qatar national football team.

External links 
 

1982 births
Living people
Qatari footballers
Al Sadd SC players
Qatar Stars League players
Association football midfielders